Parochthiphila argentiseta is a species of fly in the family Chamaemyiidae. It is present in Turkey.

References

Insects described in 2008
Chamaemyiidae